Togo is an unincorporated community in Bastrop County, Texas, United States.

School
Togo is served by the Smithville Independent School District.

References

Unincorporated communities in Bastrop County, Texas
Unincorporated communities in Texas